The Ludington Building in Chicago, Illinois is a steel frame building that is the oldest surviving of its kind in the city. It is located in the Chicago Loop community area. It was designed by William Le Baron Jenney and was named a Chicago Landmark on June 10, 1996.  It was added to the National Register of Historic Places on May 8, 1980. The Ludington Building "was commissioned by Mary Ludington Barnes for the American Book Company"; presently it is one of twenty buildings that comprise the campus of Columbia College Chicago.

References
Notes

External links

Architectural history
Commercial buildings completed in 1891
Chicago school architecture in Illinois
Commercial buildings on the National Register of Historic Places in Chicago
Chicago Landmarks
University and college academic buildings in the United States